Marcus Brown (born January 27, 1987) is a former American football cornerback who played in the National Football League. He was signed by the Seattle Seahawks as an undrafted free agent in 2010. He played college football at Arkansas State.

Brown was also a member of the Miami Dolphins.

College career
Brown redshirted as a true freshman and participated on the scout team.

As a freshman redshirt, Brown played in eight games and starting in one. He ended the season with 16 tackles with a forced fumble. He also returned a punt for 12 yards.

He sat out his entire sophomore season in 2007.

He played in all 12 games as a junior in 2008. He tallied 57 tackles with 5 of them being for a loss of yards. He also forced 2 fumbles and returned one for a 71-yard touchdown. He had one interception.

As a senior in 2009, Brown recorded 47 tackles and one forced fumble.

Professional career

Seattle Seahawks
After going undrafted in the 2010 NFL Draft, Brown signed with the Seattle Seahawks as an undrafted free agent on April 24, 2010. He was cut on September 4. He was re-signed to the practice squad two days later. On December 20, Brown was promoted to the active roster and played in his first career game on January 2, 2011, against the St. Louis Rams. He was waived on August 18.

Miami Dolphins
The Miami Dolphins signed Brown to their practice squad on December 7, 2011. He was re-signed to a future contract on January 30, 2012. The Dolphins released him during the preseason on August 25.

Utah Blaze
Brown signed with the Utah Blaze of the Arena Football League on January 10, 2013. Brown was placed on Recallable reassignment in April. Two days after his reassignment, he was claimed by the Cleveland Gladiators.

Cleveland Gladiators
A day after being assigned to the Gladiators, Brown was added to the refused to report list.

References

External links
 Arkansas State Red Wolves bio
 ESPN.com bio
 Seattle Seahawks bio

1987 births
Living people
Players of American football from Arkansas
American football cornerbacks
Arkansas State Red Wolves football players
Seattle Seahawks players
Miami Dolphins players
Utah Blaze players
Cleveland Gladiators players